The Canon EOS 7D is an APS-C digital single-lens reflex camera made by Canon. It was announced on 1 September 2009 with a suggested retail price of US$1,699. Among its features are an 18.0 effective megapixel CMOS sensor, HD video recording, its 8.0 frames per second continuous shooting, new viewfinder which offers 1.0X magnification and 100% coverage, 19-point auto-focus system, movie mode, and built-in Speedlite transmitter.

The 7D remained in Canon's model lineup without replacement for slightly more than five years—the longest product cycle for any EOS digital camera. Its successor was the Canon EOS 7D Mark II, announced on 15 September 2014.

Features
18.0 effective megapixel APS-C CMOS sensor
Dual DIGIC 4 image processors with 14-bit processing
Liveview mode
100% viewfinder frame coverage with 1.0× magnification
1080p HD video recording at 24p, 25p and 30p with drop frame timing
720p HD video recording at 50p (50 Hz) and 60p (59.94 Hz)
480p ED video recording at 50p (50 Hz) and 60p (59.94 Hz)
8.0 frames per second continuous shooting
ISO sensitivity 100–6400 (expandable to 12,800)
3.0-inch Clear View II LCD screen with 640 × 480 (921,600 dots) resolution
19-point auto-focus system, all cross-type. Center point is high precision, double cross-type at f/2.8 or faster
63-zone color sensitive metering system
built-in Speedlite transmitter
Magnesium alloy body
Popup flash
Weather sealing (light resistance to water and dust)

Autofocus and metering
The 7D has 19 autofocus points arranged in a horizontal diamond pattern. The AF system is a new design which uses a translucent LCD display in the viewfinder. The camera uses TTL 63-zone color sensitive metering system with four variations (evaluative, center-weighted, partial, spot) and exposure compensation of −5 EV to +5 EV in steps of 1/3 EV (±3 EV visible in the viewfinder and top screen, ±5 EV visible on the back screen). E-TTL II flash metering is provided. The translucent LCD can also display guide lines and the spot metering area circle. As with most other video-capable DSLRs, the Canon EOS 7D's autofocusing function does not work while recording video. Instead, users can only trigger a contrast-detect AF cycle before recording process by hitting the AF button on the camera's rear panel. Users can manually focus the lens during a recording.

Shutter
The shutter is rated to 150,000 shots, and is capable of speeds up to 1/8000 sec, with a flash sync speed of 1/250 sec.

Ergonomics
The 7D has roughly the same dimension as the older 5D Mark II with an updated button layout. It also features a 100% viewfinder with 1x magnification (equivalent in size to a 0.62x full frame viewfinder).

The 7D was the first Canon camera with a dedicated movie mode switch, instead of movie recording being done in live view as with the 5D Mark II and 500D.

Speed
 The 7D has dual DIGIC 4 processors and can reach 8 frames per second continuous shooting. When the camera was first released, the buffer throughput allowed up to 94 frames in large fine JPEG mode, and up to 15 frames in raw. Firmware upgrades, most recently in August 2012 (see immediately below), have increased the maximum buffer size to 130 large fine JPEGs and 25 raw files.

Firmware updates
On 6 August 2012, new firmware v2.0 was released with the following enhancements:
 Improved maximum burst for raw images (up to 25)
 In-camera raw image editing
 In-camera Image Rating
 In-camera JPEG resizing
 Maximum Auto ISO setting (ISO 400-6400)
 Manual audio level adjustment in movie recording
 Support for the Canon GP-E2 GPS unit
 File name customisation
 Time zone settings
 Faster scrolling of magnified images
 Quick control screen during playback

On 12 September 2012, Canon introduced the v2.0.3 firmware update with the following changes:
 Fix for a phenomenon in which the camera stops working when the auto power off setting takes effect
 Fix a phenomenon in which the maximum number of images that can be captured in a burst may be less than the actual number displayed in the viewfinder
 Corrections for some errors in the message displayed when saving raw images developed in the camera

On 2 December 2013, Canon introduced the v2.0.5 firmware update with the following changes:
 Fixes a phenomenon in which the image files cannot be transferred using the FTP protocol via USB cable after the Canon EOS 7D camera has established a wireless connection to the Wireless File Transmitter WFT-E5A.
On 13 December 2016, Canon introduced the v2.0.6 firmware update with the following changes:
 Corrects a phenomenon in which when using the camera with the EF-S 18-135mm f/3.5-5.6 IS USM or EF 70-300mm f/4-5.6 IS II USM lens, even if lens aberration correction is set to ""Enable"", correction will not be applied.

Accessories
According to Canon's website, the EOS 7D model comes equipped with:
 EOS 7D Digital SLR Body
 Eyecup E.g.
 Camera Cover R-F-3
 Wide Strap EW-EOS7D
 Battery Charger LC-E6
 Battery Pack LP-E6
 Stereo AV Cable AV-DC400ST
 Interface Cable IFC-200U

Awards
The Canon EOS 7D won the 2010–2011 European Advanced SLR Camera and the Technical Image Press Association Best DSLR Expert awards.

Video
The Canon EOS 7D offers the ability to record audio from an external source. Both shutter and aperture are available for manual control, and the 7D also provides multiple frame rate options, including three that match the HD television timing specs. Like most DSLR modes, the Canon 7D neglects endless autofocus during video recording, which is a great concern for advanced amateurs with pros likely to focus manually nonetheless. Separate movie clips that are captured by the Canon EOS 7D are limited to twelve minutes in the high definition 1080p and 720p modes, or 24 minutes in the standard definition VGA mode, depending on what Compact Flash Card is being used. Larger memory cards make for longer video lengths and are available in multiple sizes for the camera.

Independent filmmakers often use the Canon 7D as an affordable alternative to digital cinema cameras. The camera was used on the feature films  Stanley Ka Dabba, Vazhakku Enn 18/9, and The Avengers.
They have also been used on television in the opening title sequence of the 2009 season of Saturday Night Live.

Tiny Furniture was filmed using the 7D.

References

External links

Product Page
Firmware update cures residual image phenomenon (Engadget)

7D
Live-preview digital cameras
Cameras introduced in 2009